Myotis indochinensis, commonly known as the Indochinese mouse-eared bat, is a species of cave-dwelling bat in the family Vespertilionidae. It is found in Vietnam and China.

Taxonomy 
Specimens belonging to this species were previously confused with Myotis montivagus and Myotis annectans. However, they were later recognized on the basis of their larger external, cranial measurements and well-developed sagittal and lambdoid crests.

Distribution and habitat 
The species is found in Thừa Thiên-Huế Province, Tam Đảo National Park, Na Hang Nature Reserve, Mường La District, Mộc Châu District, Ta Xua Nature Reserve, and Xuân Sơn National Park. Barcoding sequences were published from Laos: Nam Pakkatan, Nakai Plateau (Khammouane Province) and Nam Pan (Bolikhamsai Province); Hà Tĩnh, Vietnam; and China: Guangxi, Jiangxi, Guangdong. 

The species is at least partially cave-dwelling and is also known to range and roost in forests.

Threats 
Although very little is known about the species, it may be under threat from the disturbance of caves and logging in its habitat.

Conservation 
The species may occur in protected areas spread across its range.

References 

Mouse-eared bats
Mammals described in 2013
Mammals of Vietnam
Mammals of China
Mammals of Laos
Bats of Asia